Cuves may refer to the following communes in France:

Cuves, Manche, in the Manche département 
Cuves, Haute-Marne, in the Haute-Marne département